Wy or WY may refer to:

Places:
 Principality of Wy, an Australian micronation
 West Yorkshire, an English county
 West Yorkshire Metro transit system
 Wyoming, US (postal abbreviation)

Other uses:
 WY Records, a record label
 Oman Air, the national airline of Oman
 WebYeshiva, a website for religious study
 Wisin & Yandel, a Puerto Rican reggaeton duo
 Weyerhaeuser (NYSE symbol WY), real estate investment trust company